Billy Childish Is Dead is a 2005 rock n’ roll-themed documentary on the life of Billy Childish.  It is directed by Graham Bendel. It features live footage of his bands Thee Headcoats, Thee Milkshakes, and others.

Awards
It was nominated for the 2005 The Raindance Award of the British Independent Film Awards.

Reception
Variety calls it a cult feature.
Music News calls it a "great rock'n'roll movie".

References

External links

2005 films
Rockumentaries